Muhammad ibn Ishaq ibn Kundaj was a prominent general of the Abbasid Caliphate in the early 10th century.

Life 
He was the son of Ishaq ibn Kundaj, a Turkic strongman who had established himself, with sanction from the Abbasid court, as the ruler of Mosul in 879. Ishaq ruled Mosul and parts of the Jazira almost uninterruptedly until his death in 891, when he was succeeded by Muhammad. Already in the next year, however, he was driven from Mosul by a rival strongman, Ahmad ibn Isa al-Shaybani. In 893, the new Caliph al-Mu'tadid campaigned in the Jazira, aiming to re-establish direct caliphal control over the region. The Caliph seized Mosul and appointed his own governor there over much of the Jazira. Ahmad retreated to Amid, while Muhammad fled to the Tulunids in Palestine.

After the assassination of the Tulunid ruler Khumarawayh in 896, Muhammad was among those members of the court who tried to assassinate Khumarawayh's successor, Jaysh. The plot was betrayed to Jaysh, and on the very same day, they fled into the desert, leaving their families and property behind. The party crossed the Syrian Desert, losing a few to thirst, and arrived in Kufa, from where they sought asylum with al-Mu'tadid. The Caliph welcomed them and allowed them to enter his service (July 896). 

Muhammad now became one of the senior members of the Abbasid court, in both civilian and military positions. In 902, after al-Mu'tadid's death, he was one of the senior subalterns of the Abbasid commander-in-chief, Badr al-Mu'tadidi. When the vizier al-Qasim ibn Ubayd Allah slandered Badr and sought to bring about his execution, Muhammad played a role in calming Badr's fears and persuading him of the sincerity of a guarantee of safe passage for Baghdad. On the way, Badr was killed by one of the Caliph's pages. In 903/4 Muhammad was among the leading officers in the campaigns against the Qarmatians, and in June 906 he led the army that drove them from the town of Hit. In 912 he was made governor of Basra.

References

Sources 
 
 
 

9th-century births
10th-century deaths
Generals of the Abbasid Caliphate
Governors of the Abbasid Caliphate
10th-century people from the Abbasid Caliphate
Year of birth unknown
Year of death unknown
9th-century Turkic people
10th-century Turkic people
People from the Tulunid dynasty